Smartest Guy In The Room is an entertainment documentary series that tests the problem solving capabilities of three individuals: Guy Messenger, Randy Rice and Terry Myers. These people are termed as having blue collar jobs but being geniuses with an IQ higher than 140. The tasks presented in the program tests the basic skills of physics, chemistry, mathematics and mechanics. Produced by Authentic Entertainment and telecast on the History Channel, the first season consisted of 12 episodes aired between 1 January and 14 February 2016.

Format
Each episode consists of two mentally challenging tasks that require planning and perseverance. In each task, one of the three men present a challenging assignment to the other two, which has to be completed within a stipulated time. Winning a challenge presents a player with one point, failing which the point goes to the person who presented the task.

Episodes

See also
 Street Genius
 List of programs broadcast by History (TV channel)

References

External links
 http://www.history.com/
 http://www.history.com/shows/smartest-guy-in-the-room

History (American TV channel) original programming
Television series by Authentic Entertainment